Nepenthe is a fictional medicine for sorrow.

Nepenthe may also refer to:

 , a luxury yacht belonging to James Deering
 Nepenthe (album), the second studio album from American singer-songwriter Julianna Barwick
 Nepenthe Productions, the production company of Martin Rosen
 Nepenthe (restaurant), a restaurant in Big Sur, California
 Nepenthe (video game), a hand-drawn role-playing video game
 Nepenthe, the setting of Norman Douglas' 1917 novel South Wind
 "Nepenthe", a song on Sentenced's 1995 album Amok
 "Nepenthe", a song on Opeth's 2011 album Heritage
 Nepenthe, a poetry-focussed science fiction fanzine published by the young Henry Earl Singleton
 Nepenthes, a genus of carnivorous plants
 Nepenthes (sculpture), a series of four sculptures by artist Dan Corson
 "Nepenthe" (Star Trek: Picard), an episode of Star Trek: Picard
 Nepenthe (villa), a villa in the south of Crete, Greece